The  Williams Center is a facility for intramural and recreational sports at the University of Wisconsin–Whitewater.

Uses
The college used the center to welcome the UW-W football team when it won the 2010 Division III national championship.

The center hosted the 2010 Division III Volleyball championship for universities in the University of Wisconsin System.

Facilities
The Williams center has the following facilities:
200 Meter Indoor Track with multi-purpose courts for basketball
Golf Hitting Cage and Putting Green
4 Racquetball Courts
Basketball Gymnasium (Main Gym)
Wrestling Gymnasium
Gymnastics Gymnasium
Volleyball Arena
Dance Studio
Swimming Pool and Diving Well

Sports Teams

UW–Whitewater is a member of NCAA Division III for athletics. It is a member of the Wisconsin Intercollegiate Athletic Conference (WIAC). The athletics teams are nicknamed the Warhawks and wear purple and white.

Mission statement
The mission of the Office of Recreation Sports and Facilities is to provide facilities, programs, and services that address all physical, recreational, and leisure pursuits of the university community. Emphasis is placed on participation, increasing knowledge of wellness and physical fitness, and promoting healthy lifestyle behaviors.

References

External links
 Photo gallery

University of Wisconsin–Whitewater
Sports venues in Wisconsin
Whitewater, Wisconsin
Buildings and structures in Walworth County, Wisconsin
Sports in the Milwaukee metropolitan area